Miraj - Hubballi Intercity Express is an intercity train of the Indian Railways connecting Miraj Junction in Maharashtra and Hubballi Junction of Karnataka. It is currently being operated with 17331/17332 train numbers on a daily basis.

Service

The 11047/Miraj - Hubballi Express has an average speed of 45 km/hr and covers 279 km in 6 hrs 45 mins.

Route and halts 

The important halts of the train are:

Traction

Both trains are hauled by a Hubballi Loco Shed based WDP-4B diesel locomotive from Miraj to Hubballi.

Notes

External links 

 11047/Miraj - Hubballi Express
 11048/Hubballi - Miraj Express

References 

Express trains in India
Rail transport in Maharashtra
Rail transport in Karnataka
Transport in Hubli-Dharwad